Dynasty is an Australian TV series that aired from 7 October 1970 to 6 October 1971, based on the 1967 Tony Morphett novel of the same name which had been previously adapted as a television play.

1969 TV play
The novel was first adapted as a television play produced by the Australian Broadcasting Commission (ABC), and broadcast in October 1969 as one installment of an anthology series of unrelated plays under the title Australian Plays.

The project was written by Morphett based on his novel, and directed in Melbourne by Oscar Whitbread.

Plot
Inventor Jim Richards (Terry Norris) seeks financial backing from the Mason Corporation for his new machine. He finds himself in the middle of a power struggle for control of the corporation, including a family dispute. David Mason uses his affair with his sister-in-law Kathy to his advantage.

Cast
Terry Norris as Jim Richards
Brian James as Jack Mason, head of family
Mark McManus as Peter Mason, a brother
Ron Graham as John Mason, a brother
Kevin Miles as David Mason
Alan Hopgood

Reception
The Sydney Morning Herald called the play "the best thing the ABC has done in a long, long time."
"Dynasty belongs to a handful of programs, all produced by the ABC, which examine media power in Australia and indeed it would be interesting to compare Dynasty with later studies such as The Oracle (1979) and Paper Man (1990)." Moran praised actor John Tate for a "very strong performance".

TV series
Following the success of the TV play, a regular TV series was produced with a largely different cast. Premiering in July 1970, the first series consisted of 10 episodes, and the second and final series consisted of 13 episodes.

Plot summary
Dynasty follows media mogul Jack Mason and his grasping sons John, David and Peter.

Cast
 John Tate as Jack Mason (Episodes 1–10)
 Ron Graham as John Mason
 Kevin Miles as David Mason
 Nick Tate as Peter Mason
 Anne Haddy as Kathy Mason, John's wife
 Pat Bishop as Patricia Mason, Peter's wife
 Serge Lazareff as Christopher Mason, John and Kathy's son
 Owen Weingott as Jacob Goldberg
 Ben Gabriel as 'Unk' Martel
 Tony Ward as Nigel Dayton
 Lyn James as Maggie Tench, Jack's secretary

Episodes
Twenty-three episodes were produced.

Series 1

Series 2

References

External links
 
 Dynasty at Classic Australian TV
 Dynasty TV series at AustLit
Dynasty rehearsal script at National Archives of Australia

1970 Australian television series debuts
1971 Australian television series endings
Australian drama television series
Australian Broadcasting Corporation original programming
English-language television shows